Martin Laciga (born January 25, 1975 in Aarberg) is a retired beach volleyball player from Switzerland, who won the silver medal in the men's beach team competition at the 1999 Beach Volleyball World Championships in Marseille, France, partnering his older brother Paul Laciga (born 1970). He represented his native country at two consecutive Summer Olympics, starting in 2000 (Sydney, Australia).

Laciga announced his retirement from competition in 2013 due to injuries.

Playing partners
 Markus Egger
 Paul Laciga
 Jan Schnider

Sponsors
 Swatch

References

External links
 
 
 

1975 births
Living people
Swiss beach volleyball players
Men's beach volleyball players
Beach volleyball players at the 2000 Summer Olympics
Beach volleyball players at the 2004 Summer Olympics
Beach volleyball players at the 2008 Summer Olympics
Olympic beach volleyball players of Switzerland
People from Aarberg
Sportspeople from the canton of Bern